Damen Verolme Rotterdam, is a repair shipyard in Rotterdam, Netherlands.

History

Foundation 
The company was founded in 1957 by Cornelis Verolme as Verolme Dok en Scheepsbouw Maatschappij (VDSM). In 1955 Verolme owned Verolme Verenigde Scheepswerven, a collection of two small Dutch shipyards and a small machine factory. Nevertheless, he decided to construct a huge shipyard, capable of meeting the demand for ever larger ships. Meanwhile, the Port of Rotterdam Authority was developing the Botlek industrial and harbor area near Rozenburg. In this empty space close to the sea on the deep Nieuwe Waterweg, Verolme wanted to realize his vision of shipbuilding and repair.

RSV (1971-1983) 
In 1971 the holding Verolme Verenigde Scheepswerven fused with Rijn-Schelde Machinefabrieken en Scheepswerven NV to become Rijn-Schelde-Verolme (RSV). RSV existed from 1971 to 1983 and ended in a financial catastrophe.

Verolme Botlek 
The shipyard survived the dissolution of RSV. In 1981 it was renamed Verolme Botlek

Keppel Verolme 
In 2002 the shipyard was bought by Keppel Corporation, and was henceforward known as Keppel Verolme.

Part of Damen Group (current situation) 

In 2017 the shipyard became part of the Damen Group, and received its current name. The Company has a large dry dock of 405 x 90m.

Ships built

Notes

External links 
 Damen Verolme Rotterdam
Shipbuilding companies of the Netherlands
Companies based in Rotterdam